Van de Wiele is a Dutch-language toponymic surname in Belgium meaning "from the wiel". A wiel is a pool or small lake formed by a dyke breach. Some of the variants (with # of people in 2007 in the Netherlands and in 2008 in Belgium) are Van de Wiel (3615, 195), Van der Wiel (2082, 42), Van de Wiele (40, 1522), Vandewiele (0, 1132), Van der Wiele (211, 7), and Van der Wielen (2323, 159). Notable people with the surname include:

Aimee van de Wiele (1907-1991) Belgian composer and keyboardist
Daniel Van de Wiele (born 1956), Belgian boxing referee
Eric Van De Wiele (born 1952), Belgian racing cyclist
Iris Vandewiele (born 1994), Belgian volleyball player
Isidoor Van De Wiele (1924–2010), Belgian sprinter
Jan Van De Wiele (born 1948), Belgian racing cyclist
Jef van de Wiele (1903–1979), Belgian Nazi politician
Mieke Van De Wiele (born 1952), Belgian businesswoman

See also
Van de Wiel
Van der Weele

References

Dutch-language surnames
Toponymic surnames
Surnames of Belgian origin